TransEuropean Airlines was a charter airline based in Russia. It operated charter flights between Moscow and popular holiday destinations, mostly Barcelona and Antalya.

History

Transeuropean Airlines was founded in 1996 and sometime in late 2000, the airline went bankrupt.

Fleet
TransEuropean Airlines fleet consisted of the following aircraft:

See also

List of defunct airlines of Russia

Airlines established in 1996
Airlines disestablished in 2000
Defunct airlines of Russia
Companies based in Moscow